Silver Wolf Award may refer to:

 Silver Wolf Award (The Scout Association)
 Silver Wolf Award (Norwegian Guide and Scout Association)
 Silver Wolf Award (Scouterna)